Nikolay Sergeyevich Zhurkin (born 5 May 1991) is a Russian professional racing cyclist, who most recently rode for UCI Continental team .

Major results

2009
 1st  Kilo, UCI Juniors Track World Championships
 UEC European Junior Track Championships
2nd  Sprint
3rd  Kilo
2010
 3rd  Kilo, UEC European Under-23 Track Championships
2012
 1st  Team pursuit, UEC European Under-23 Track Championships
2013
 1st  Team pursuit, 2012–13 UCI Track Cycling World Cup, Aguascalientes
2015
 1st Stage 3 Bałtyk–Karkonosze Tour
2019
 Vuelta Ciclista a Costa Rica
1st Stages 3b (TTT) & 6

References

External links

1991 births
Living people
Russian male cyclists
Sportspeople from Dushanbe